Terry Gene Kilgore (born August 23, 1961) is an American attorney and politician. A Republican, he was elected to the Virginia House of Delegates in 1993, and became chair of the Commerce and Labor committee in 2008.  He graduated with a B.A. from the University of Virginia's College at Wise, previously named Clinch Valley College, and a J.D. from the College of William & Mary's School of Law.

Kilgore's twin brother, Jerry, was Attorney General of Virginia 2002–2005, and was the unsuccessful Republican candidate for Governor of Virginia in 2005, losing to Tim Kaine. Kilgore's mother, Willie Mae Kilgore, was the registrar of voters in Kilgore's home jurisdiction, Scott County, until December 2008. He has two children. Following the 2019 elections in which Republicans lost their majority in the Virginia House of Delegates, Kilgore sought the minority leader position. Republicans regained control of the House of Delegates in 2021.

Electoral history

Notes

External links 

 Virginia Public Access Project: Terry G. Kilgore
 
 Terry Kilgore for Delegate

21st-century American politicians
20th-century American politicians
1961 births
Methodists from Virginia
Identical twins
Living people
Republican Party members of the Virginia House of Delegates
People from Kingsport, Tennessee
People from Scott County, Virginia
American twins
William & Mary Law School alumni